The University of Florida College of Liberal Arts and Sciences (CLAS) is the college for the liberal arts and sciences of the University of Florida, and the largest of the university's 16 academic colleges.  Most core curriculum classes, 43 majors, and 47 minors are part of the college.  The university reports that more than 700 faculty members teach at least 35,000 students each year, with more than 11,000 undergraduates pursuing a degree from the college and 1,500 graduate students are also attaining graduate degrees in the college.

The college faculty have received a variety of national and international awards, including the Pulitzer Prize, Guggenheim Fellowships, Senior Fulbright Awards, National Science Foundation Fellowships, Presidential Young Investigator Awards and National Endowment for the Humanities Fellowships. They hold memberships in the National Academy of Sciences, the Nobel Prize Committee, the Swedish Royal Academy of Sciences and the Royal Societies of London and Edinburgh.

Liberal Arts and Sciences students have numerous scholarships and awards for their academic performance.  During the past several years, CLAS students have been recognized as a Rhodes Scholar, Barry Goldwater Scholars, Harry Truman Scholars, and James Madison Scholars.

National rankings according to US News (2020 edition)

Departments

Research Centers and Institutes

Additional Programs and Centers

Deans of the College of Liberal Arts and Sciences

Research 
The College of Liberal Arts and Sciences was awarded $40 million in annual research expenditures in sponsored research for 2018.
Liberal Arts and Sciences researchers have been involved in groundbreaking research in a variety of disciplines. Their achievements include contributions of the algorithm and input optics for LIGO, which has detected several "chirps" of gravitational waves produced by colliding black holes. Other significant research includes Project Implicit, which studies implicit bias.
The college includes experts on pressing topics such as climate change.

Alumni
Notable alumni of the college include politicians Bob Graham, Debbie Wasserman Schultz, and Marco Rubio; former ambassador Dennis K. Hays, Kathy Fields, co-creator of Proactiv and Rodan + Fields skincare; Nobel Prize-winning chemist Robert Grubbs; award-winning authors Kate DiCamillo and James Grippando, and Pulitzer-winning journalist Dexter Filkins.

See also
University of Florida
Subtropics Literary Magazine

Notes

External links
Official website for the College
Gainesville Sun info about the College
Ytori Magazine
CLAS Academic Advising info
Overview of the College
Capital Campaign for the College
Gainesville Sun article about the Dean's search

Liberal Arts and Sciences
Liberal arts colleges at universities in the United States
Educational institutions established in 1910
1910 establishments in Florida